|}

The Prix du Lys is a Group 3 flat horse race in France open to three-year-old thoroughbred colts and geldings. It is run at Longchamp over a distance of 2,400 metres (about 1½ miles), and it is scheduled to take place each year in May.

History
The event is named after Le Lys, a small forest close to Chantilly on the left bank of the Oise river. It was established in 1922, and was originally open to colts and fillies, but not geldings. Its distance was 2,400 metres. It was initially restricted to horses not entered for the Prix du Jockey Club or the Prix de Diane.

The Prix du Lys was cancelled in 1940, and was held at Longchamp in 1941 and 1942. It was run at Le Tremblay over 2,300 metres in 1943 and 1944, and at Longchamp again for three years thereafter.

The exclusion of Prix du Jockey Club and Prix de Diane entrants ended in 1970. The race was closed to fillies and opened to geldings in 1986.

The Prix du Lys was contested over 2,800 metres at Saint-Cloud from 1993 to 1996. In the following years it was run over 2,600 metres at Maisons-Laffitte (1997–98) and Chantilly (1999–2000).

The race's original distance was restored in 2001, and from this point it was staged at Longchamp. It returned to Chantilly in 2009 and was run there until 2016. In 2017 it was run at Saint-Cloud and since 2018 it has been staged at Longchamp again. It is currently held on the same day as the Prix d'Ispahan and Prix Saint-Alary.

Records
Leading jockey (6 wins):
 Roger Poincelet – Djelal (1947), Mistralor (1954), Jithaka (1956), Rugby (1962), Nasram (1963), Steady (1967)
 Freddy Head – Mazarin (1969), Azorello (1973), Ercolano (1977), Fabulous Dancer (1979), Bellman (1981), Iris Noir (1984)

Leading trainer (15 wins):
 André Fabre – Iris Noir (1984), Luth Dancer (1987), Northern Spur (1994), Swain (1995), Vertical Speed (1997), Epistolaire (1998), Morozov (2002), Doyen (2003), Desideratum (2005), Rail Link (2006), Airmail Special (2007), Claremont (2009), Goldwaki (2010), Kreem (2011), Flintshire (2013)

Leading owner (6 wins):
 Sheikh Mohammed – Swain (1995), Morozov (2002), Doyen (2003), Desideratum (2005), Airmail Special (2007), Claremont (2009)

Winners since 1979

Earlier winners

 1922: Mazeppa
 1923: Grand Guignol
 1924: Scaramouche
 1925: Chubasco
 1926: Felton
 1927: Sachet
 1928: Bachelier
 1929: Double Dutch
 1930: Menthol
 1931: Triberg
 1932: Satrap
 1933: Magnus
 1934: Verset
 1935: Will of the Wisp
 1936: Fantastic
 1937: Khasnadar
 1938: Molitor
 1939: Shrift
 1940: no race
 1941: Nepenthe
 1942:
 1943: Bambou
 1944: Orsava
 1945: Kerlor
 1946: Eclair
 1947: Djelal
 1948: Espace Vital
 1949: Urfe
 1950: Alizier
 1951: Pharas
 1952: Orfeo
 1953: Sunny Dream
 1954: Mistralor
 1955: Fauchelevent
 1956: Jithaka
 1957: Mehdi
 1958: Upstart
 1959: Memorandum
 1960: Tehuelche
 1961: Le Bois Sacre
 1962: Rugby
 1963: Nasram
 1964: Trade Mark
 1965:
 1966: Danseur
 1967: Steady
 1968: Vaguely Noble
 1969: Mazarin
 1970: High Game
 1971: Music Man
 1972: Hair Do
 1973: Azorello
 1974: Blue Diamond
 1975: Corby
 1976: Exceller
 1977: Ercolano
 1978: Nizon

See also
 List of French flat horse races

References

 France Galop / Racing Post:

 france-galop.com – A Brief History: Prix du Lys.
 galop.courses-france.com – Prix du Lys – Palmarès depuis 1980.
 galopp-sieger.de – Prix du Lys.
 ifhaonline.org – International Federation of Horseracing Authorities – Prix du Lys (2019).
 pedigreequery.com – Prix du Lys.

Flat horse races for three-year-olds
Longchamp Racecourse
Horse races in France
Recurring sporting events established in 1922
1922 establishments in France